A dump analyzer is a programming tool which is used for understanding a machine readable core dump.

Introspector is a core dump analyzer for a compiler.

References 

Debugging